Conjunct consonants are a form of orthographic ligature characteristic of the Brahmic scripts. They are constructed of more than two consonant letters. Biconsonantal conjuncts are common, but longer conjuncts are increasingly constrained by the languages' phonologies and the actual number of conjuncts observed drops sharply. Ulrich Stiehl includes a five-letter Devanagari conjunct among the top 360 most frequent conjuncts found in Classical Sanskrit; the complete list appears below. Conjuncts often span a syllable boundary, and many of the conjuncts below occur only in the middle of words, where the coda consonants of one syllable are conjoined with the onset consonants of the following syllable.

Biconsonantal conjuncts
The table below shows all 1296 combinations of two Sanskrit letters. Not all of these form conjuncts (these instead show a halanta under the first letter), and the number that do will vary with the Devanagari font installed. There is variation in the conjuncts that are in use for any given language. Some of the combinations below that do not form conjuncts may not be viable combinations in any language.

The romanization (in ISO 15919) and IPA of each conjunct will appear with mouseover.

Tri- and tetra-consonantal conjuncts

Most frequent conjuncts
These are the 360 most-frequent conjuncts in Sanskrit:

References

Works cited
 

Conjunct consonant
Devanagari